The Last Frontier also released as The Final Stand is a 2020 Russian WWII film written and directed by Vadim Shmelyov. A story about the heroic performance of the Podolsk cadets’ (ru) at the Battle of Moscow in October 1941.

Plot 
The cadets of the Podolsk artillery and infantry schools are completing their training, and they will soon become commanders. Two friends compete for a girl. Suddenly, the command learns about the breakthrough of the front and the movement of a German tank column to Moscow. The only serious force is the cadets, they must stop the Germans at the Ilyinsky defence line and hold out until the reserves approach. In fierce battles, where many of them die, they fulfill this task.

Cast 

 Aleksey Bardukov as Lieutenant Afanasiy Aleshkin
  as the head of the Podolsk Artillery School, Colonel 
 Sergey Bezrukov as Captain 
 Lubov Konstantinova as Junior Sergeant Mariya 'Masha' Grigorieva, nurse
 Artyom Gubin as Junior Sergeant Aleksandr 'Sashka' Lavrov, cadet
 Igor Yudin as Sergeant Mitya Shemyakin, cadet
 Guram Bablishvili as Lieutenant Museridze
 Dmitriy Solomykin as Lieutenant Shapovalov
 Roman Madyanov as Major General Vasily Smirnov
 Yekaterina Rednikova as Military doctor Nikitina
 Sergey Bondarchuk Jr. as Major Dementyev
 Darya Ursulyak as Liza Aleshkina
 Daniil Spivakovsky as engineer Uglov
 Vasiliy Mishchenko as Lieutenant General Eliseev
 Gleb Bochkov as Sergeant Yakhin
 Oleg Ots as Bogatov, cadet
 Aleksey Kopashov as Simonov
 Gleb Danilov as Slavik Nikitin
 Aleksey Takharov as Azamat Khalilov, cadet
 Dmitry Topol as Ibragimov, cadet
 Pavel Stont as Vasilkov, cadet
 Aleksandr Lobanov as Battalion Commissar Andropov
 Stas Shmelev as Senior Lieutenant Nosov
 Nikolay Samsonov as Paramedic Petrov
 Pavel Krainov as Captain Rossikov
 Kirill Zaporozhskiy as Senior political instructor Lepekhin
 Darya Konyzheva as Red Army women Lyusya Shishkina
 Pavel Levkin as Senior Lieutenant Mamchich
 Dmitry Brauer as Germany Major Werner

Production 

The film was shot at a specially built film complex "VoenFilm" in Medyn, where a village was built, pillboxes were dug, a river was built and filled with water, and part of the Varshavskoye Highway was dumped. Historical consultants tried to achieve maximum reliability of what was shown, up to the reconstruction of the numbers of tanks and aircraft; in particular, Bezrukov's character is armed with a Thompson submachine gun, since such a weapon was found during excavations at the Ilyinsky border.

Filming 

The filming location of the feature film took place from August to November 2018, Scenes of Peaceful Days: Ivanovskoe Estate in the Podolsk Urban Okrug, Moscow Oblast and Kaluga Oblast.

The project was supported by the Ministry of Culture of the Russian Federation, the Ministry of Defense of the Russian Federation, the Ministry of Emergency Situations, the Governor of Moscow Oblast and Governor of Kaluga Oblast, deputies of the State Duma, the Russian Youth Union, well-known public and political figures.

The Central Archives of the Russian Ministry of Defence provides advisory support and proper supervision over the credibility of the film.

The supervisory board of the film project is headed by Viacheslav Fetisov.

Reception

Budget
The film's budget was 450 million rubles, of which 60 million were provided by the Ministry of Culture, the rest was allocated by investors, distributors and a film studio.

Release
The film was released in Russian by Central Partnership on November 4, 2020.

Awards
The film received three awards at the 2021 Prague Independent Film Festival —  Grand Prix, Best Director, Best Actor (Sergey Bezrukov) and Best Score.

References

External links 
 Official website 
 

2020 films
2020s Russian-language films
Eastern Front of World War II films
Films set in 1941
Films set in Moscow
Films set in the Soviet Union
World War II films based on actual events
Films about armoured warfare
2020s action war films
Russian action war films
2020 war drama films
Russian war drama films
2020s historical action films
Russian historical action films
Russian World War II films